Alfredo Gottardi (14 January 1915 – 23 April 2001), known as Cajú, was a Brazilian footballer. He played in six matches for the Brazil national football team in 1942. He was also part of Brazil's squad for the 1942 South American Championship.

References

External links
 
 

1915 births
2001 deaths
Brazilian footballers
Brazil international footballers
Footballers from Curitiba
Association football goalkeepers
Club Athletico Paranaense players